Leucaniini is a tribe of cutworm or dart moth in the family Noctuidae. There are at least 40 described species in Leucaniini.

Genera
 Leucania Ochsenheimer, 1816
 Mythimna Ochsenheimer, 1816
 Senta Stephens, 1834

References

 Lafontaine, J. Donald & Schmidt, B. Christian (2010). "Annotated check list of the Noctuoidea (Insecta, Lepidoptera) of North America north of Mexico". ZooKeys, vol. 40, 1-239.

Further reading

External links

 Butterflies and Moths of North America

Noctuinae